The Cortaillod culture is one of several archaeologically defined cultures belonging to the Neolithic period of Switzerland. The Cortaillod Culture in the west of the region is contemporary with the Pfyn Culture
in the east and dates from between 3900-3500 BC. The Classic Cortaillod culture of the western Alpine foreland and the Early Cortaillod culture of central Switzerland pre-date this at 4300-3900 BC.

Evidence, such as higher frequencies of dog bones and pendants made from dog metapodials, suggests a special relationship between dog and man during the later part of this period in the western part and the early Horgen culture in the eastern part of the Alpine foreland.

Gallery

Sources 

Schibler, J. 2006. The economy and environment of the 4th and 3rd millennia BC in the northern Alpine foreland based on studies of animal bones. Environmental Archaeology 11(1): 49-64

Archaeological cultures of Central Europe
Archaeological cultures in Switzerland
Neolithic cultures of Europe
Cortaillod